Carlos Andrés Soza Quezada (born 3 January 1990) is a Chilean footballer that currently plays for Deportes Puerto Montt as a striker.

References

External links
 
 
 Carlos Soza at Football-Lineups
 Carlos Soza at playmakerstats.com (English version of ceroacero.es)

1990 births
Living people
People from Copiapó
Chilean footballers
Chilean expatriate footballers
Deportes Copiapó footballers
Cobresal footballers
Lota Schwager footballers
Deportes Iquique footballers
Deportes Iberia footballers
Rangers de Talca footballers
Deportes Melipilla footballers
C.D. Olmedo footballers
A.D.R. Jicaral players
Limón F.C. players
Magallanes footballers
Deportes Magallanes footballers
Chilean Primera División players
Primera B de Chile players
Ecuadorian Serie B players
Liga FPD players
Association football midfielders
Chilean expatriate sportspeople in Ecuador
Expatriate footballers in Ecuador
Chilean expatriate sportspeople in Costa Rica
Expatriate footballers in Costa Rica